Keith Francis Hanson (born April 26, 1957 in Ada, Minnesota and raised in Bemidji, Minnesota) is a retired American professional ice hockey defenseman who played 25 games for the Calgary Flames of the National Hockey League during the 1983–84 NHL season.  He was drafted 145th overall by the Minnesota North Stars in the 1977 NHL amateur draft, but was traded to the Flames in 1983 without playing a game for Minnesota.  In his 25 games in the NHL, he scored two assists and racked up 77 penalty minutes.  He also played for team in the AHL, IHL and the CHL. He retired in 1985.

External links

1957 births
Living people
American men's ice hockey defensemen
Birmingham South Stars players
Calgary Flames players
Colorado Flames players
Ice hockey players from Minnesota
Minnesota North Stars draft picks
Moncton Golden Flames players
People from Bemidji, Minnesota
People from Ada, Minnesota
Toledo Goaldiggers players
Northern Michigan Wildcats men's ice hockey players